Metodije ( 1219) was the Serbian Orthodox bishop of Raška in the first half of the 13th century. He was the hegumen of Hilandar, serving Archbishop Sava. After the autocephaly of the Serbian Church (15 August 1219), Metodije was appointed the bishop of Raška and hieromonk Ilarion of Hilandar was appointed the bishop of Zeta; Raška and Zeta were the central regions of Serbia.

References

Medieval Serbian Orthodox bishops
Medieval Serbian Orthodox clergy
13th-century Serbian people
13th-century deaths
12th-century births
Saint Sava
People of the Grand Principality of Serbia
People of the Kingdom of Serbia (medieval)
Medieval Athos
Athonite Fathers
People associated with Hilandar Monastery